Baicalellia daftpunka is a species of rhabdocoel flatworm. Its type locality is Clover Point, in Victoria, British Columbia, Canada. The specific name comes from the electronic music duo Daft Punk, known for their signature helmets; their name reflects their helmet-shaped stylets.

See also
 List of organisms named after famous people (born 1950–present)

References

Further reading

 

Rhabditophora
Animals described in 2018